Babuvirus is a genus of viruses, in the family Nanoviridae. Musa species serve as natural hosts. There are three species in this genus. Diseases associated with this genus include: stunting, severe necrosis and early plant death. BBTV induces banana bunchy top disease (BBTD).

Taxonomy
The following species are included in the genus:
 Abaca bunchy top virus
 Banana bunchy top virus
 Cardamom bushy dwarf virus

Structure and genome

Viruses in the genus Babuvirus are non-enveloped, with icosahedral and round geometries, and T=1 symmetry. The diameter is around 18-19 nm.

Genomes are multipartite with 6 to 8 circular segments. Genome size is around 81 kb in totsl.

Life cycle
Viral replication is nuclear. Entry into the host cell is achieved by penetration into the host cell. Replication follows the ssDNA rolling circle model.  DNA templated transcription is the method of transcription. The virus exits the host cell by nuclear pore export, and  tubule-guided viral movement.
Musa species serve as the natural host. The virus is transmitted via a vector (aphids). Transmission routes are vector.

References

External links
 ICTV Report Nanoviridae
 Viralzone: Babuvirus
 

Nanoviridae
Virus genera